The 2013 GCC U-23 Championship was the fifth edition of the GCC U-23 Championship. It took place in Riffa, Bahrain for the first time. Six nations took part. The competition was held in Riffa from 15 to 26 August. The hosts Bahrain won their first title after defeating title holders Saudi Arabia 1–0 in the final.

The 2013 edition was officially known as the Huawei GCC National Teams Under-23 Championship owing to sponsorship by Huawei.

Teams
{| class="wikitable sortable"
|-
! Team
! data-sort-type="number"|Previous appearances in tournament
|-
|  (host) || 4 (2008, 2010, 2011, 2012)
|-
|  || 4 (2008, 2010, 2011, 2012)
|-
|  || 4 (2008, 2010, 2011, 2012)
|-
|   || 4 (2008, 2010, 2011, 2012)
|-
|  || 4 (2008, 2010, 2011, 2012)
|-
|   || 3 (2010, 2011, 2012)
|}

Venues

Group stage

Group A

Group B

Knockout stage
In the knockout stage, extra time and penalty shoot-out were be used to decide the winner if necessary (Regulations Articles 10.1 and 10.3).

Bracket

Semi-finals

Third place play-off

Final

Winners

Awards
The following awards were given at the conclusion of the tournament:

Goalscorers

References

External links
GCC U-23 Championship at Goalzz

GCC U-23 Championship
2013
2013 in Asian football
2013–14 in Bahraini football
2013–14 in Qatari football
2013–14 in Saudi Arabian football
2013–14 in Omani football
2013–14 in Kuwaiti football
2013–14 in Emirati football
2013 in youth association football